"Je lui dirai" (meaning "I Will Tell Him") is the third promotional single from Celine Dion's album, Miracle (2004). It was released on 11 October 2004 in France and Belgium. "Je lui dirai" was written by Jean-Jacques Goldman and produced by Erick Benzi. The song was originally featured on the 2003 album 1 fille & 4 types.

Background and release
On 1 October 2003 Dion taped the 1 fille & 4 types TV special at Caesars Palace in Las Vegas, where she performed this song among others.

The music video was directed by Scott Lochmus and released on 25 October 2004. It shows the making of the Miracle: A Celebration of New Life book.

"Je lui dirai" peaked at number 22 on the Belgian Wallonia Airplay Chart.

The song was later included on Dion's 2005 greatest hits album On Ne Change Pas

Charts

References

Celine Dion songs
2004 singles
French-language songs
Songs written by Jean-Jacques Goldman
2004 songs
Columbia Records singles
Epic Records singles
Song recordings produced by Erick Benzi